Edelweiss Cheung (born 27 October 1985) is a Hong Kong model and beauty pageant titleholder who was crowned Miss Hong Kong 2008.

Biography
Cheung was on born 27 October 1985 in British Hong Kong. Her parents are Chinese Americans from Shantou, Guangdong.
She attended at Hoi Ping Chamber of Commerce Secondary School and also educated in American International School Hong Kong. Later, she move to United States to attend design classes at the Burgo Fashion and Design Institute.

She competed in Miss Hong Kong Pageant which was held on 19 July 2008 at the Hong Kong Convention and Exhibition Centre. She won the Miss Hong Kong 2008 pageant. After winning the crown, Cheung was criticised for smoking and kissing her boyfriend in public. The pageant organiser TVB froze Cheung's contract following criticism of her behaviour on public, which it deemed unfit for a Miss Hong Kong champion. Cheung was not invited to present at Miss Hong Kong Pageant 2009 and crown her successor, Sandy Lau.

References

External links
Miss Hong Kong: Edelweiss Cheung
Edelweiss Cheung - TVB Blog
Miss Hong Kong Pageant 2008 Official Website
Edelweiss Cheung - contestant bio
Gallery - contestant images
  	

1985 births
Living people
Miss Hong Kong winners